Los Ríos is a province in Ecuador. The capital is Babahoyo. The province was founded on October 6, 1860. Under legislative decree. Babahoyo was made its capital on September 30, 1948.

Demographics
Ethnic groups as of the Ecuadorian census of 2010:
Mestizo  52.9%
Montubio  35.1%
Afro-Ecuadorian  6.2%
White  5.0%
Indigenous  0.6%
Other  0.3%

Economy
The province's economy is largely based on its agriculture: coffee, cacao, bananas, rice, tobacco, etc. Its small industrial sector produces paper, sugar, and wood crafts. Recently developed tourist attractions include fishing and native rituals.

Cantons 
The province is divided into 13 cantons. The following table lists each with its population at the time of the 2010 census, its area in square kilometres (km²), and the name of the canton seat or capital.

See also 

 Provinces of Ecuador
 Cantons of Ecuador

References 

 
Provinces of Ecuador